State Highway 74, usually abbreviated as SH-74 or OK-74 (or simply Highway 74) is the numbering of two different highways maintained by the U.S. state of Oklahoma. These highways were once a single major north–south route, connecting Oklahoma City to more rural parts of the state. The original road stretched from SH-7 near Tatums to SH-11 west of Deer Creek.

Due to encroaching Interstate highways—especially Interstate 35 (I-35)—the middle section of the route through Norman, Moore, and Oklahoma City was decommissioned in 1979 for reasons of redundancy. However, some maps show SH-74 as running concurrently with I-35, I-240, and I-44, thus linking the two sections.

Route descriptions

Southern section

From the southern terminus at SH-7, the southern section of SH-74 goes due north to Elmore City, where it intersects with SH-29. After a couple of turns in the Elmore City area, the highway continues due north to Maysville and SH-19. Still continuing northward, the highway meets the southern terminus of SH-24, and continues into Purcell.

In Purcell, SH-74 overlaps U.S. Highway 77 (US-77) and SH-39. It finally splits off and begins heading west. From here, the highway becomes more hilly and curvy as it heads toward Washington. However, Washington is accessible via SH-24, which has its northern terminus at SH-74 as well. (Both termini of SH-24 are at SH-74.)

The highway then returns to a due north course after its intersection with SH-24. It goes through the town of Goldsby and then ends at I-35.

Northern section

The highway's northern section begins at a combination interchange with I-44 in Bethany. The first part of the northern section is a freeway, called the Lake Hefner Parkway because part of it runs along the east shore of Lake Hefner. The freeway, a major part of the Oklahoma City freeway system, serves the northwestern part of Oklahoma City. The freeway ends at 164th Street, and SH-74 continues northward on Portland Avenue.

The road passes through the towns of Crescent, Covington, and Garber, Oklahoma as it continues, again on a due north course. Between Covington and Garber the road intersects with US-64/US-412, which can be used to access Enid, just  to the west.

 north of US-412, the highway meets US-60 near Lamont. The two roads share a brief concurrency before splitting off again.  north of this, SH-74 intersects with SH-11 between Deer Creek and Numa, Oklahoma. It is at this intersection that the designation ends.

History

In 1927, a spur from SH-33 to Crescent was created as SH-44. SH-44 was renumbered to SH-74 in 1931. On December 10, 1934, SH-74 was extended southward to Oklahoma City. The highway was further extended on September 9, 1935, to Norman. In 1935 and 1936, the highway's alignment through Norman was modified; it was extended from its Main Street terminus to US-77.

Also in 1936, SH-74 began expanding northward. On August 18, the designation was added to a new section of highway between Crescent and US-64 (now SH-164) in Covington. Nearly a year later, the route was extended southward again. The State Highway Commission lengthened SH-74 through Goldsby and Purcell to SH-19 in Maysville on July 1, 1937. The section of highway from Covington to US-60 in Lamont was added on April 14, 1941. On June 5, 1945, it was extended further south to SH-29 in Elmore City (at the time simply named Elmore).

Throughout the 1950s, SH-74 continued to be realigned and extended. Southwest of Norman, it swapped routings with SH-9 on December 6, 1954. SH-74 was extended twice in 1957, once in each direction: to the north on February 18 and to the south on June 10. The 1957 lengthening brought SH-74 to its greatest length, with its present-day northern terminus and a southern terminus at SH-53 near Milo.

By 1967, I-35 had been constructed through Oklahoma City. On January 4, 1967, SH-74 was split into two sections, with the removal of the section between Goldsby and Norman. The southern section was truncated on December 12, 1974, bringing the highway to its current southern terminus. The gap between the two sections of SH-74 was widened on March 3, 1975, when the route was eliminated through Cleveland County and much of Oklahoma City, bringing SH-74 to its present-day termini.

The Lake Hefner Parkway opened in 1992. SH-74 was transferred to the new freeway on April 6. Between April and July 2001, ODOT installed a Brifen Safety Fence cable barrier along the Lake Hefner Parkway section of SH-74. This installation was the first application of this barrier design in the United States. The freeway was extended from its former terminus just north of the Kilpatrick Turnpike to 164th Street in 2016.

Spurs
SH-74 currently has five spur routes (starting at B, and going up to a suffix of F). Prior to 2009, SH-74A served as a spur route in Norman as well, though it did not intersect SH-74.

SH-74A

SH-74A ran along Lindsey Street in Norman, connecting I-35 to Classen Boulevard, the contemporary routing of US-77. This highway ran straight through the University of Oklahoma (OU) campus.

SH-74A was established by action of the Highway Commission on September 23, 1936. The highway's original extent was from SH-9/SH-74 (24th Avenue S.W.) to the OU campus, ending at Jenkins Avenue. It was later extended to I-35 in the west and US-77 in the east. It was removed by January 2010.

SH-74B

SH-74B connects SH-74 in Goldsby to SH-76 south of Blanchard. Cole lies along the middle of this hilly spur.

SH-74C

SH-74C connects SH-74 in Crescent to US-77 north of Guthrie.

SH-74D

SH-74D connected SH-74 to the unincorporated community of Lovell. It was eliminated from the state highway system on March 5, 2018.

SH-74E

SH-74E goes from SH-51 north to Marshall, and then it goes east and ends at SH-74. This spur was commissioned on August 6, 1951.

SH-74F

SH-74F goes from SH-74 west to Cashion, and then goes north to SH-33.

Junction list

Southern section

Northern section

References

External links

SH-74's north section at OKHighways.com 
SH-74's south section at OKHighways.com
SH-74B at OKHighways.com
SH-74C at OKHighways.com
SH-74D at OKHighways.com
SH-74E at OKHighways.com
SH-74F at OKHighways.com

074
Transportation in Oklahoma City
Transportation in Carter County, Oklahoma
Transportation in Garvin County, Oklahoma
Transportation in McClain County, Oklahoma
Transportation in Oklahoma County, Oklahoma
Transportation in Logan County, Oklahoma
Transportation in Garfield County, Oklahoma
Transportation in Grant County, Oklahoma